Angela Altagracia "Tata" de Lannoy-Willems (31 May 1913 – 10 July 1983) was a Curaçaoan politician. In 1949 she became the first female member of the Estates of the Netherlands Antilles.

Biography
The 1949 elections to the Estates of the Netherlands Antilles were the first held under universal suffrage. Using the name De Lannoy-Elisabeth she was a candidate of the National People's Party. Initially she was not elected but a few months after the elections she succeeded M.F. da Costa Gomez and became the first female member of the Estates. She was re-elected in 1950, remaining a member until 1954. In 1951 she was also appointed to the Council of Ministers and was also elected to Curaçao Island Council.

References

1913 births
National People's Party (Curaçao) politicians
Members of the Estates of the Netherlands Antilles
Curaçao women in politics
1983 deaths